Iva Mišak (born March 16, 1993) is a Croatian alpine skier, member of the Croatian Alpine Ski Team.

Mišak was born in Varaždin, in Croatia. She has not participated in FIS Alpine Ski World Cup. Her best result so far in a FIS race was 1st place in giant slalom. In slalom races at the FIS Alpine World Ski Championships she placed 35th in 2011 and 43rd in 2013.

References

External links
 Iva Mišak on FIS

1993 births
Living people
People from Varaždin
Croatian female alpine skiers